The term cosmotheology, along with the term "ontotheology", was invented by Immanuel Kant "in order to distinguish between two competing types of "transcendental theology".

Kant defined the relationship between ontotheology and cosmostheology as follows: 
"Transcendental theology aims either at inferring the existence of a Supreme Being from a general experience, without any closer reference to the world to which this experience belongs, and in this case it is called cosmotheology; or it endeavours to cognize the existence of such a being, through mere conceptions, without the aid of experience, and is then termed ontotheology."

Notes and references

Philosophy of religion
Immanuel Kant
1780s neologisms